Sylvain Lautié (born 11 June 1968 in Saint-Cloud) is a French professional basketball coach. He is the current head coach of SLUC Nancy Basket of the LNB Pro A and Malian national team, which he coached at the 2017 Women's Afrobasket.

References

French basketball coaches
Living people
1968 births
French expatriate sportspeople in Mali
SLUC Nancy Basket coaches
Sportspeople from Saint-Cloud